A list of movies filmed in Alice Springs, Australia, and surrounding areas.

Listed below are a further collection of TV series and movies that have been partially filmed in Alice Springs.

The Blue Planet (2000) TV series 
Bush Mechanics (2001) (mini) TV series 
Double Trouble (2006) TV series
Familie på farten - med farmor i Australien (2005) TV series
... Familie på farten''' (2005) (Denmark: promotional title) Here Comes the Neighbourhood (2005) TV series Soldier Soldier (1991) TV series  The Adventures of Priscilla, Queen of the Desert (1994)The Alice (2004) (TV)  Equipaje, lista de espera, pasaporte, souvenir (1994) Evil Angels (1988) 
...a.k.a. A Cry in the Dark (1988) (International title) G'Day LA (2007) Journey Out of Darkness (1967)  Kangaroo Jack (2003)  The Last Frontier (1986) (TV)  Outback Stripper (2001) (TV) Phantom Stockman, The (1953)
...a.k.a. Return of the Plainsman (1953) (USA) Pine Gap (2018) (Australian Broadcasting Corporation & Netflix TV)(Australia) Quigley Down Under (1990) 
...a.k.a. Quigley (1991) (Australia) 
...a.k.a. Quigley Down Under (1990) (Australia) Walkabout (1971)  Welcome to Woop Woop (1997)  Who Killed Baby Azaria? (1983) (TV) 
...a.k.a. The Dingo Baby Case (1983) (TV) 
...a.k.a. The Disappearance of Azaria Chamberlain (1983) (TV)Socrates in Love, also known as Crying Out Love, in the Center of the World, is a Japanese film that used Alice Springs as its filming location.  The television series Star Trek: Enterprise'' used Alice Springs as the location of an astronaut survival training station.

See also
Cinema of Australia
List of Australian films

References

Alice Springs
Films, Alice Springs
Alice Springs
Films
Alice Springs